Amalie Grøn Hansen (born 30 October 1996) is a Danish handballer who plays for Viborg HK.

References

Danish female handball players
1996 births
Living people
People from Fredericia
Viborg HK players
Sportspeople from the Region of Southern Denmark